Joseph James (13 January 1910 – January 1993) was an English professional footballer who played in the Football League for Brentford as a centre half. In 2013, James placed third in a Football League 125th Anniversary poll of Brentford's best ever captains. He is a member of the Brentford Hall of Fame and made over 250 appearances for the club.

Career

Early years
Born in Battersea, James began playing football as a youth for local club Battersea Church.

Brentford
James appeared in a friendly match for Third Division South club Brentford in August 1928 and impressed manager Harry Curtis. Though not awarded a contract, James became the assistant groundsman at the club's Griffin Park stadium. In August 1929, James was offered a contract and turned professional. Beginning life in the reserve team, he was a part of the team which won the London Combination title in the 1931–32 and 1932–33 seasons. Consistently behind Jimmy Bain in the pecking order, James made his debut for the club on 21 November 1931 in a 2–1 away win for the Bees over Brighton & Hove Albion. He made a further six appearances during the 1931–32 season and another five the following year.

With the Bees playing Second Division football for the 1933–34 season, James finally broke into the team, making 35 appearances and scoring his first goal for the club in a 4–1 away win over Oldham Athletic on 14 October 1933. James made 40 appearances and scored one goal during the 1934–35 season, a campaign in which the Bees won the Second Division championship (securing a place in the top-flight for the first time in the club's history) and the London Challenge Cup. James averaged just over 41 appearances a season in the First Division (many of them as captain) and was part of the team which finished fifth in 1935–36 (Brentford's highest-ever finish in the pyramid) and which topped the table for nearly half of the 1937–38 season. James' final professional appearance for the Bees came on 19 August 1939, in a 5–1 Football League Jubilee Fund defeat to Chelsea.

The outbreak of the Second World War in September 1939 saw competitive football suspended for the duration of hostilities. James remained with Brentford during the war and captained the team to the 1941–42 London War Cup, winning the trophy at the second time of asking. James played on until February 1944, when he retired after suffering a broken wrist in a 5–3 defeat to Charlton Athletic. He made 165 appearances for the Bees during the war. In a Football League 125th anniversary poll, James was ranked by the Bees supporters as the club's third best-ever captain and was one of the first inductees to the Brentford Hall of Fame in 1991.

Colchester United
After the war, James, now in his mid-thirties, signed for Colchester United of the Southern League. He made his debut on 17 November 1945 in a 3–1 away defeat to Hereford United and played his last game for the club on 2 February 1946, an 8–0 defeat at the hands of Bath City. He made a total of 9 appearances for Colchester.

Personal life 
James died in January 1993.

Career statistics

Honours 
Brentford
 London Combination: 1931–32, 1932–33
 Football League Second Division: 1934–35
 London Challenge Cup: 1934–35
 London War Cup: 1941–42

Individual
 Brentford Hall of Fame

References

1910 births
1993 deaths
Footballers from Battersea
English footballers
Brentford F.C. players
Colchester United F.C. players
English Football League players
Southern Football League players
Association football central defenders